Chris Curran may refer to:

 Chris Curran (actor) (died 1996), Irish actor, singer and musician
 Chris Curran (Australian footballer) (1974–2018), former Australian rules footballer
 Chris Curran (footballer, born January 1971) (born 1971), English footballer for Crewe Alexandra, Scarborough and Carlisle United
 Chris Curran (footballer, born September 1971) (born 1971), English footballer for Torquay United, Plymouth Argyle and Exeter City